Sodium hexanitritocobaltate(III) is inorganic compound with the formula . The anion of this yellow-coloured salt consists of the transition metal nitrite complex . It was a reagent for the qualitative test for potassium and ammonium ions.

Synthesis and reactions
The compound is prepared by oxidation of cobalt(II) salts in the presence of sodium nitrite:

Application for analysis of potassium
Although the sodium cobaltinitrite is soluble in water, it forms the basis of a quantitative determination of potassium, thallium, and ammonium ions. Under the recommended reaction conditions the insoluble double salt,  is precipitated and weighed. In geochemical analysis, sodium cobaltinitrite is used to distinguish alkali feldspars from plagioclase feldspars in thin section.

See also
Potassium hexanitritocobaltate(III)

References

Cobalt complexes
Sodium compounds
Chemical tests
Inorganic compounds
Coordination complexes
Nitrates